Fallen Moon or variation, may refer to:

The Fallen Moon, sci-fi novel by Ian Watson (author) 1994
Fallen Moon series of fantasy novels by K. J. Taylor that include The Dark Griffin (2009) and The Griffin's Flight
Fallen Moon (manga), an anthology comic book by Toui Hasumi
 The Fallen Moon, a fictional band from the manga Fuuka
 Fallen Moon, a fictional band from the manga Suzuka; see List of Suzuka characters
 Abbey of the Fallen Moon, a fictional location from Pillars of Eternity: The White March
Fallen Moon, film project by Peter Medak

See also

 Falling Moon (disambiguation)
 Moonfall (disambiguation)
 Fallen (disambiguation)
 Moon (disambiguation)